U.P. Pt. Deen Dayal Upadhyaya Veterinary Science University and Cattle Research Institute or U.P. Pt. Deen Dayal Upadhyay Pashu Chikitsa Vigyan Vishwavidyalaya Evam Go-Ansundhan Sansthan, formerly Veterinary College, Mathura is a university and the fourth oldest veterinary school in India. It is located in the city of Mathura.

The university was established as a college in 1947 by the government of Uttar Pradesh. In 2001, it was converted into a university.

Curriculum 

The college offers B. V. Sc and A.H., M. V. Sc. and PhD programs in veterinary science and a B. Sc. program in fisheries science. The college offers other programs, such as biotechnology, microbiology, surgery, gynecology, pharmacology, physiology, biochemistry, health, clinical medicine and toxicology.

Facilities 

The parasitology, pathology and osteology departments have large specimen collections. Many subspecies of salmonella such as S. goverdhan, S. mathurae and Mycoplasma sps have been researched there.

The clinics department offers X-ray and ultrasound facilities.

References

External links 
Official website

Universities in Uttar Pradesh
Veterinary schools in India
Agricultural universities and colleges in Uttar Pradesh
Universities and colleges in Uttar Pradesh
Education in Mathura
Educational institutions established in 1947
1947 establishments in India
Animal husbandry in Uttar Pradesh
Memorials to Deendayal Upadhyay